The Holy Trinity Monastery is a Serbian Orthodox monastery located in the Banat region, in the northern Serbian province of Vojvodina. The monastery is situated in the town of Kikinda. It was built in 1885-87 as a foundation of Melanija Nikolić-Gajčić.

See also
List of Serbian Orthodox monasteries

External links
More about the monastery
Monasteries in Banat

Serbian Orthodox monasteries in Serbia
Serbian Orthodox monasteries in Vojvodina
Banat
Kikinda